The Greater London Authority referendum of 1998 was a referendum held in Greater London on 7 May 1998, asking whether there was support for the creation of a Greater London Authority, composed of a directly elected Mayor of London and a London Assembly to scrutinise the Mayor's actions. Voter turnout was low, at just 34.1%. The referendum was held under the provisions of the Greater London Authority (Referendum) Act 1998.

Referendum question
The question that appeared on ballot papers in the referendum before the electorate was:

permitting a simple YES / NO answer.

Result

Results by borough

The 'Yes' vote won in every London Borough, though support generally was larger in Inner London than in Outer London. The lowest support figures were 60.5% in Havering and 57.1% in Bromley; the greatest were 83.8% in Haringey and 81.8% in Lambeth. Income level of boroughs was even a greater factor affecting the outcome.

Aftermath

The government passed the Greater London Authority Act 1999, creating the Greater London Authority. Elections for the Mayor of London and the London Assembly were held in May 2000.

References

External links
MayorWatch London Elections Guide

Devolution referendum
1998 referendums
Devolution referendum
Referendums in England
Devolution in the United Kingdom
May 1998 events in the United Kingdom